Anne Stedman (born January 17, 1976) is an American actress known for such roles as Dyna Girl in Electra Woman and Dyna Girl for The WB Television Network and Melanie on The Mullets which aired on UPN network.

She is also the creator of Chic Mama LA (aka Anne Stedman Herwick) which has spun off a successful web series Chic Mama Carpool and Chic Mama Drama.

Career

Acting
Stedman who was born in San Antonio, Texas started her career while studying at University of Texas at Austin when Richard Linklater hand picked her for the role of Madeline in his film The Newton Boys.  She then moved to Los Angeles, California to begin her acting career.  Stedman then starred in such movies as Space Cowboys  with Clint Eastwood and Tommy Lee Jones and Dr. Dolittle 2 with Eddie Murphy.  She went on to land a lot of tv roles such as That '70s show playing the girlfriend of Danny Masterson, Electra Woman and Dyna Girl, The Mullets and Mal de Ojo airing on HBO.  She was most recently on Life in Pieces on CBS playing Sangria, Colleen's stepmom and Tarzana which is airing on Apple TV.

Blogger
In May 2012, Stedman created Chic Mama LA all about fashion, beauty and tips about being a mom.  In 2017 a web series Chic Mama Carpool was then created which has starred such celebrity moms as Jordana Brewster, Molly Sims and Marla Sokoloff  In 2018 she started a scripted series Chic Mama Drama about making a talk show, running a fashion website, being an actress...all while being a mom.

Author
In 2016, Stedman along with her family, wrote a book Mary's Story: A Family's Journey With Cancer about her sister Mary who died of cancer.

Film and television

External links

 Anne Stedman on Instagram

References

1976 births
Living people
21st-century American actresses
American film actresses
American television actresses